Rhinecliff–Kingston station (often simply Rhinecliff station), is an Amtrak intercity rail station located in Rhinecliff, New York. It serves northern Dutchess County and the nearby Kingston area across the Hudson River on the west bank. The station has one low-level island platform, with a portable wheelchair lift for accessibility. It is served by the Ethan Allen Express, Adirondack, Empire Service and Maple Leaf.

Rhinecliff station is popular with owners of weekend homes in the area, who commute to and from New York City or other downstate locations. In addition, it serves some daily commuters who prefer Amtrak's service to that of Metro-North's out of Poughkeepsie. These riders, along with students and others going to and from nearby Bard College, made Rhinecliff the 46th-busiest Amtrak station in 2004, with 86,466 boardings. Occasional suggestions to bring Metro-North service to Rhinecliff have been stalled by community opposition and track ownership issues.

History

The station building was built by the New York Central Railroad in 1914, in the Mission-Spanish Revival style. It is similar to the next station south at Hyde Park. After the NYC ended its West Shore passenger service, in 1958, Amtrak took over the station in 1971. Like much of the hamlet of Rhinecliff, the station is a contributing property to the Hudson River Historic District, which is listed on the National Register of Historic Places.

A Kingston–Rhinecliff Ferry began providing service between the two communities in July 2015, as a revival of former service that was discontinued in 1957 with the opening of the Kingston-Rhinecliff Bridge. Ferry service had long been associated with the former Rhinebeck and Connecticut Railroad.

References

External links 

Kingston-Rhinecliff Amtrak Station – USA Rail Guide (TrainWeb)

Amtrak stations in New York (state)
Former New York Central Railroad stations
Buildings and structures in Rhinebeck, New York
Railway stations in Dutchess County, New York
Railway stations in the United States opened in 1914
Historic district contributing properties in New York (state)
National Register of Historic Places in Dutchess County, New York
Railway stations on the National Register of Historic Places in New York (state)